Denvention is the name given to three World Science Fiction Conventions. All three of the conventions were held in Denver, Colorado.

 Denvention I, 1941
 Denvention II, 1981
 Denvention 3, 2008